Konstantin Anatolevich Bogdanov is a Russian anthropologist and philologist whose areas of investigation covers Russian culture, including folklore, rhetoric, and the history of science and humanities.
He has also researched the history of social thought in 18-20th Century Russia.

Education 
Konstantin Bogdanov was born 1963 in Leningrad, USSR. He obtained his undergraduate degree in Classical Philology and Russian Language and Literature at St. Petersburg State University. During this time Bogdanov became a member of the Russian Academy of Science. 

In 1992, Dr. Bogdanov completed his PhD with the dissertation: “Magic Spelling in Russian Folklore: A Structural Analysis:. During this time period he was also a leading researcher for the Institute of Russian Literature of the Russian Academy of Sciences. Dr. Bogdanov was also featured as a Senior Lecturer in St. Petersburg. During this time, he obtained a grant from the Kennan Institute for Advanced Russian Studies and produced an investigation of Social Thought in 19th Century Russia.

Konstantin Bogdanov continued his post-doctoral work with the Russian Academy of Sciences, producing a dissertation on: “Russian Folklore; Semiotics of Reality”.

Teaching 
He has taught at various Russian Universities courses on Greco-Roman Culture, Russian literature of 18th and 20th century, survey courses on Russian culture (from the 17th century till middle of the 20th century). During the long association with the University of Constance (Germany) he has also had courses in Russian literature and culture over the entire range of Russian history in English and in Russian.
He has vast experience in teaching Greek, Latin, and Russian language courses (beginning, intermediate and advanced levels).
His major scholarly interests focused on historical and theoretical aspects of 18th-20th Russian literature and culture.
The main area of investigation was still Russian Literature and Folklore, History of Social Thought, History of Russian and European Rhetoric, Cultural History of Russian and Soviet Humanities.

Professional Activities 
Since 1992 Bogdanov is Leading (Senior) Researcher at The Institute of Russian Literature (The Pushkin 
House), Russian Academy of Sciences in St. Petersburg, Russia. 
Since 2001 he is Visiting Professor (Privatdozent) at the Department of Slavic Studies at the University of Constance, Germany. 2001-2003 he has a two years Research Project on History of Translation and Adaptation of European Rhetoric in 17-18th Century Russia (German Title "Rhetorische Begriffsbildung als Adaptations- und Übersetzungsprozess im ostslavischen Raum des 17. und 18. Jahrhunderts", supported by Thyssen Stiftung). After that from he has a two years Research DFG Project on Soviet Sciences of the 1920-1930 (German Title "1+1=3". Zur Entstehung der sowjetischen Wissenschaften in den 1920er und -30er Jahren. Deutsche Forschungsgemeinschaft(DFG). 2007 was started a new research project of Konstantin  Bogdanov supported by DFG  about the History of Mathematik and Humanities in the Soviet Union (German Title "Ziffer und Buchstabe. Diskursive, ideologische und mediale Transformationen in den sowjetischen Humanwissenschaften der 1950er und 60er Jahre"). 

Since January 2008 he is  Head of the Research Group “Ziffer und Buchstabe. Diskursive, ideologische und mediale Transformationen in den sowjetischen Humanwissenschaften der 1950er und 60er Jahre”, University of Constance.
Dr. Bogdanov is an active organizer of professional conferences, most notably being active in the annual conference on “Mythology and Day-to-day Life” by the Russian Academy of Science in St. Petersburg. He has also been instrumental in planning the Round Table on Rhetorics of Soviet Science in 2006 and 2007 at the University of Constance in Germany, in addition to their 2003 conference on Russian literature and medicine.

Monographs
Vox Populi. The Folklore Genres of Soviet Culture. Novoe literaturnoe obozrenie. Moscow. 2009.
Crocodiles in Russia. A History of Exoticism and Loan Words. Moscow: NLO, 2006. 352 pp. 
Rec.: Andrew Khan, in: Anthropological Forum, Nr. 8, 2008; Andrei Martynov in : NG ex libris, 21.09.1006; S.D. in: Literatura, Nr. 09, 2006. Sergey Prokhorov in: Nevskoye Vremya, 24.05.06; Sergey Shpalov in: Kultura, Nr. 21, 1-7.07.06; Olga Kadikina in: Krug Chteniya, 30.05.06; Vsevolod Brodsky in: Expert On-line: http://www.expert.ru/printissues/expert/2006/19/book_reptiliiya.
Physicians, Patients, Readers: Pathographical Texts of Russian Culture of 18 -19th Centuries. Moscow: OGI, 2005, 520 pp. 
Rec.: Andrei Topotrkov in: NLO, Nr. 85, 2007; Zakharine, Dmitri in: Anthropological Forum, Nr. 6, 2006, P. 381-386; Anna Kusnecova in: Znamya, Nr. 11, 2005.
Everyday Life and Mythology: Studies on Semiotics of Folklore Reality. St. Petersburg: Iskusstvo, 2001, 438 pp. 
Aratus. Phaenomena. Ancient Greek Text with Russian Translation, Introduction and line-by-line Commentary. St. Petersburg:  Aleteia, 2000, 252 pp. 
Homo Tacens. Anthropology of Silence. St. Petersburg: Russian Christian Institute for the Humanities Press, 1998, 354 pp. 
Money in Russian Folklore, St. Petersburg: Bell, 1995, 125 pp.

The full publication list is on the Homepage University of Contance:https://web.archive.org/web/20110604214934/http://www.uni-konstanz.de/FuF/Philo/LitWiss/Slavistik/Bogdanov/Bibliographie.html

External links 
https://web.archive.org/web/20090530143528/http://www.uni-konstanz.de/FuF/Philo/LitWiss/Slavistik/Bogdanov/Biograpie.html
http://www.gumer.info/bibliotek_Buks/Linguist/bogd/07.php
http://www.expert.ru/printissues/expert/2006/19/book_reptiliiya_obschestvennogo_znacheniya/

Russian anthropologists
Russian philologists
1963 births
Living people